RS Telescopii, abbreviated RS Tel, is a variable star in the southern constellation of Telescopium. It is a dim star with an apparent visual magnitude of 10.67, which is much too faint to be visible without a telescope. The variability of this star was discovered by Evelyn F. Leland and announced by Edward C. Pickering in 1910. It was first studied by Cecilia H. Payne in 1928 at the Harvard College Observatory.

This is an R-type carbon star with a class of R0.  RS Tel is a typical R Coronae Borealis variable—an extremely hydrogen-deficient supergiant thought to have arisen as the result of the merger of two white dwarfs; fewer than 100 have been discovered as of 2012. It has under 55% the mass of the Sun and an effective temperature of around 5,800 K. The spectrum of the star shows anomalously weak lines of hydrogen, with strong lines of C2, CN, and neutral carbon.

RS Tel has a maximum magnitude of 9.6 and a minimum magnitude 16.5. The star undergoes large, random variations in brightness on a time scale of thousands of days with no apparent periodicity.  The star is surrounded by a circumstellar shell of dust which radiating an infrared excess.

References

Carbon stars
R Coronae Borealis variables
Telescopium (constellation)
CD-46 12279
089739
Telescopii, RS
TIC objects